Fuji no Makigari (富士の巻狩り) was a grand hunting event arranged by shogun Minamoto no Yoritomo from June to July 1193, centering around the foot of Mount Fuji. 700,000 participated in the event, including a large number of the shogun's gokenin (retainers) and their beaters.

Overview 
Fuji no Makigari was held from June 8 to July 7, 1193 for about a month. Including the samurai's beaters, a total of 700,000 participated in the hunting event, and the historical chronicle of Azuma Kagami describes the scale of the event stating, "Such a crowd of archers that there is no point measuring." On June 8, 1193, the chronicle states "We arrived in Suruga Province to see the summer hunting event in Aizawa, Fujino" and "We are heading back to Kamakura from Suruga Province" on July 7, 1193. Hōjō Tokimasa was sent to Suruga Province on May 2 of the same year to prepare for the event, and had left earlier. 

The participants spent the majority of the time in Fujino, from June 15th to July 7th, with Azuma Kagami stating "We are staying at the Fujino Goryokan after hunting in Aizawa" on May 15, 1193.  During this time, the Revenge of the Soga Brothers incident occurred on May 28th. Many people came to hear the news after the incident had occurred. It is said that a massive horde of countless gokenin and other influential people were crowding Fujino. 

It is said that the purpose of Fuji no Makigari was to show off the authority of the shogun and to carry out military exercise. The hunting event began on the east side of the foot of Mount Fuji (what is currently Gotemba and Susono, Shizuoka Prefecture) and extended to the Asagiri Plateau (currently Fujinomiya, Shizuoka Prefecture) to the west. The land of Aizawa and Kamino, where the hunting was carried out, is located near the border between Suruga and Kai Provinces, which is also a major transit point from Kai to the Tōkaidō road, the most important of the Five Routes of the Edo period. In this way, it has been pointed out that the Minamoto clan of Kai (Kawachi Genji) intended to take control of the traffic route used to reach the Tōkaidō road.

Participants 
 Minamoto no Yoritomo
 Minamoto no Yoriie
 Hōjō Tokimasa
 Hōjō Yoshitoki
 Ashikaga Yoshikane
 Hatakeyama Shigetada
 Kajiwara Kagetoki
 Kajiwara Kagesue
 Kajiwara Kagetaka
 Kajiwara Kagesmochi
 Kajiwara Asakage
 Kajiwara Kagesada
 Soga Sukenobu
 Soga Sukenari
 Soga Tokimune
 Gosho no Gorōmaru
 Nitta Tadatsune
 Ōtomo Yoshinao
 Ogasawara Nagakiyo
 Miura Yoshizumi
 Miura Yoshimura
 Miura Yoshitsura
 Chiba Naritane
 Inage Shigenari
 Wada Yoshimori
 Yamana Yoshinori
 Oyama Tomomasa
 Oyama Munemasa
 Oyama Tomomitsu
 Satomi Yoshinari
 Sanuki Hirotsuna
 Kudō Suketsune
 Kudō Kagemitsu
 Kudō Yukimitsu
 Tsuchiya Yoshikiyo
 Kasuya Arisue
 Toki Mitsuhira
 Shishido Iemasa
 Hatano Yoshikage
 Aikō Suetaka
 Unno Yukiuji
 Fujisawa Kiyochika
 Mochizuki Shigetaka
 Sasaki Moritsuna
 Sasaki Yoshikiyo
 Shibuya Shigekuni
 Takeda Nobumitsu
 Yoshikawa Tomokane
 Katō Mitsukazu
 Moro Suemitsu
 Sahara Yoshitsura
 Inage Shigenari
 Naganuma Munemasa
 Utsunomiya Yoritsuna
 Yūki Tomomitsu
Tairako Arinaga
Kikkawa Tomokane
Okabe Yasaburō
Okabe Kiyomasu
Hori Fujita
Shimokōbe Yukihira
Sawara Toshitsura
Hangaya Shigetomo
Itō Suketoki
Usuki Hachirō
Ōtōnai

All according to Azuma Kagami.

Incidents

Minamoto no Yoriie's deer  
On June 16, 1193, Yoritomo's 12-year-old son Yoriie shot a deer for the first time. Hunting was stopped and a festival was held in the evening. Yoritomo was rejoiced by his son's achievement and sent a messenger to his wife Masako, but she sent the messenger back, saying that a military commander's son being able to shoot a deer is nothing to celebrate.

Kudō Kagemitsu 
During the hunting on June 27, a big deer suddenly ran before Yoritomo. Kudō Kagemitsu, who was near Yoritomo, shot at the deer. Kagemitsu, a master of archery, shot up to three times, but missed all his shots. Kagemitsu said, "I have been hunting for more than 70 years since I was 11 years old, but I have never failed to kill my prey. This must be the deer that Yama-no-Kami rides." 

As people were already wondering about the strange incident, the same evening Kagemitsu fell ill and collapsed. Yoritomo thought this was very strange and considered ending the hunting event and returning home. However, after receiving advice from his shukurō (wise old men) the hunting continued the next day and for the following seven days.

Revenge of the Soga Brothers 

On June 28, 1193, on the last night of Fuji no Makigari, the Revenge of the Soga Brothers took place at the event causing a turmoil. The participants were staying in Kamino, Fujino (in present-day Kamiide, Fujinomiya, Shizuoka Prefecture). The Soga brothers, Soga Sukenari and Tokimune, entered Kamino no Goryokan, where Kudō Suketsune, the killer of their biological father, was staying, and killed Suketsune. Ōtōnai, who was drinking sake with Suketsune was also killed by the brothers. Two prostitutes, Tengo-no-Shuku and Kisegawa-no-Shuku, who were accompanying Suketsune, started screaming causing a big uproar at the scene. After the brothers killed Uda Gorō and nine other participants injuring Tairako Arinaga, Aikō Suetaka, Kikkawa Tomokane, Katō Mitsukazu, Unno Yukiuji, Okabe Yasaburō, Okabe Kiyomasu, Hori Fujita and Usuki Hachirō at the scene, the elder brother Sukenari was shot by Suketsune's subordinate Nitta Tadatsune. The younger brother Tokimune killed all the samurai one by one who attempted to stop him, and raided Yoritomo's living quarters. However, Gosho no Gorōmaru, who was in Yoritomo's bedchamber, took Tokimune down and captured him, thus ending the massacre and saving the shogun from a possible assassination attempt. After this, Yoritomo took Tokimune in for questioning and had him executed the next day.

Related events 

 Yokkaichi Festival, Fuji no Makigari procession
 One of the processions in the Yokkaichi Festival, held in Yokkaichi, Mie Prefecture. It can be seen in the An'ei era (1772-1781), and it is also written about in the diary of the painter Shiba Kōkan in 1788, as "see the procession of Fuji no Makigari." Children dressed as samurai (Minamoto no Yoritomo on horseback, Hōjō Tokimasa, Soga Tokimune, etc.) wearing resplendent costumes shoot at a 4-meter-long papier-mâché wild boar. Fumio Niwa's Bodaiju, which received the Order of Culture, vividly depicts the appearance of this procession.
 Sannō Festival and Kanda Festival of the Edo period
 Fuji no Makigari appears in Buyō Inshi's Seji Kenbunroku in "Volume 5: Things of the Townspeople", which records Fuji no Makigari-related festivals held in 1816.

See also 

 Minamoto no Yoritomo
 Revenge of the Soga Brothers
 Kamakura shogunate

References 

1193
Kamakura period